Gilchrist Nguema (born 7 August 1996) is a Gabonese international footballer who plays for Israeli club Maccabi Ahi Nazareth, as a centre back.

Club career
Born in Libreville, Nguema played for Villanovense, Tourizense and Sertanense.

In 2018 Nguema played for the Liga de Elite club Benfica de Macau and won the 2018 season.

On 7 August 2019, Nguema signed in the Liga Leumit club Bnei Sakhnin. On 22 January 2021, Nguema signed for Maccabi Ahi Nazareth.

International career
On 12 November 2020, Nguema made his international debut for Gabon.

Honours
 Benfica de Macau
Liga de Elite: 2018

References

1996 births
Living people
Sportspeople from Libreville
Gabonese footballers
Gabon international footballers
G.D. Tourizense players
Sertanense F.C. players
S.L. Benfica de Macau players
Bnei Sakhnin F.C. players
Maccabi Ahi Nazareth F.C. players
Liga Leumit players
Association football defenders
Gabonese expatriate footballers
Expatriate footballers in Portugal
Expatriate footballers in Macau
Expatriate footballers in Israel
Gabonese expatriate sportspeople in Portugal
Gabonese expatriate sportspeople in Macau
Gabonese expatriate sportspeople in Israel
21st-century Gabonese people